Midlands  is a small village (population approx 4,500 in 2006) in Mauritius situated approximately halfway between Nouvelle France and Curepipe on the M2 motorway. Midlands is on the highlands of the island at approximately 386 metres.

Populated places in Mauritius